The former Leota School for Girls, also known as the Bones School, is a historic Victorian architecture residential building completed in 1910 in Evansville, Wisconsin at 443 South First Street. It was originally constructed as a home for Vivas C. and Phila Holmes, owners of the Evansville Mercantile Association (Grange Store). The home was sold in 1934 to William and Jenny Bone who opened the school. They also operated the Leota Camp based at the home. The school closed in 1959.

See also
Evansville's Historic District

References

Buildings and structures in Rock County, Wisconsin